Henry Glanville Southwell (20 May 1830 – 2 July 1890) was an English first-class cricketer and clergyman.

The son of Henry Southwell, he was born in May 1830 at Saxmundham in Norfolk. He was educated at Harrow School, where he played for the cricket eleven, before going up to Trinity College, Cambridge. While studying at Cambridge, he played first-class cricket for Cambridge University Cricket Club in 1852 and 1853, making six appearances. He scored 84 runs in his six matches, with a highest score of 22. His appearances in the University Matches of 1852 and 1853 gained him a cricket blue.

After graduating from Cambridge, he took holy orders in the Anglican Church in 1856, when he was ordained a deacon at Lincoln Cathedral. His first ecclesiastical post in Lincolnshire was as curate at Usselby in 1856, a post he held until 1865. He was then curate at Croxby and Beelsby in 1865 to 1875, before becoming the reverend of Rothwell until his death in July 1890 at Nettleton, Lincolnshire. His son-in-law was the cricketer, jockey and politician John Maunsell Richardson.

References

External links

1830 births
1890 deaths
Cricketers from Norfolk
People from Saxmundham
People educated at Harrow School
Alumni of Trinity College, Cambridge
English cricketers
Cambridge University cricketers
19th-century English Anglican priests